"The Vaporization Enthalpy of a Peculiar Pakistani Family" is a short science fiction story by Pakistani author Usman T. Malik. Inspired by Sufi poetry and music, Malik attended the Clarion West Writers Workshop for aspiring sci-fi and fantasy writers. Motivated by his success with the workshop, Malik began writing and ultimately led the first speculative writing workshop in Lahore, Pakistan. "The Vaporization Enthalpy of a Peculiar Pakistani Family" is a story about family relationships, the rough lifestyle in Pakistan, and is published worldwide.

Plot
"The Vaporization Enthalpy of a Peculiar Pakistani Family" includes two main characters, Tara and her younger brother Sohail. The story begins with Sohail mourning over the loss of his love, Gulminay. Too distraught, Sohail leaves Tara behind with their Mother, referred to as "Ma'' and goes to the Mountains. Months later, Ma dies due to sickness and old age. Left all alone, Tara decides to go to the City to live with her mother's cousin Wasif. Looking back on her life, Tara goes through the painful memories of being taken out of school at thirteen and being a widow at sixteen, and decides that she wants to go back to school. After two years of studying, Tara enrolls in the BS program at Punjab University. One year, the City suffers from extreme flooding, with devastating damages. Wasif and Tara volunteer to do rescue work after the flood has passed. When witnessing multiple dead bodies, and helping injured people, Tara remembers her brother. During this time, Pakistan was continuously suffering from terrorist attacks, and the City was falling apart, so Tara leaves and heads for the Mountains. After weeks of travel, Tara is finally reunited with Sohail in the Mountains. Both brother and sister go through multiple tragedies and obstacles, and once reconnected, they finally reach equilibrium.

Setting
This story takes place in Pakistan, but does not specify where. The characters often mention places vaguely using phrases such as, "the City", or "the Mountains". The main character Tara also enrolls in Punjab University located in Lahore, Pakistan. Details in the story describing terrorist attacks and suicide bombings, suggest the story takes place during a violent time period in Pakistan.

Awards & nominations

Publication history

Critical reception
Because Malik's story is published worldwide, there is a broad range of readers. Overall many readers enjoyed the story, but there was some controversy about the genre. Some readers would consider it science fiction and support its 2015 Nebula nomination, because of Malik's short introductions including chemistry, and the hints about monsters throughout the story. On the other hand, some readers believe that although there is a scientific factor, the story focuses mainly on the lifestyle and terrorist attacks in Pakistan. Others consider the short story to be a warning. Malik shows how this story is similar to Pakistan; the story is built on the debris of suicide bombers, drone strikes, floods, and many other miseries of present-day Pakistan. Both Tara and Sohail facing the tragedies that happened to them like Gulminay's death, although gory, are easy for readers to picture. Whether Malik's short story should be considered science fiction or not, majority of readers came to the conclusion that Malik appropriately depicts the terrors that occur in Pakistan, and what life can be like for some of the people who live there.

References 

Science fiction short stories
2015 short stories
2010s science fiction works